The Dutch Basketball League Rookie of the Year is an award that is yearly given to the best first-year player in the DBL, the highest professional basketball league in the Netherlands. The award is handed out after the regular season. The award is handed out by the FEB (Federatie Eredivisie Basketbal). Only Dutch players can win the award.

Winners

References

Dutch Basketball League awards